"2012 (It Ain't the End)" is a song by British singer Jay Sean taken from the compilation album, Hit the Lights. It features rapper and labelmate Nicki Minaj and is the album's lead single. The song was produced by OFM production team J-Remy and Bobby Bass. It was released to US radio stations and was available for digital download on 3 August 2010.  The title is a reference to the 2012 phenomenon.

Critical reception

'2012' received mixed reviews by About.com and Digital Spy. Bill Lamb from About.com rated the single 4 out of 5 stars commenting on "The powerful vocal kickoff", "Expansive world party atmosphere" and "Nicki Minaj on guest raps". Lamb noted that the song was similar to that of "Down" and concluded that "2012 (It Ain't the End) feels like a wise move for Jay Sean capitalising on the party success of his two prior hits "Down" and "Do You Remember" while moving into an even more expansive sound". Robert Copsey from Digital Spy rated the song with 3 out of 5 stars, commenting that: "'2012' finds him recreating the USA-slaying synthpop/R&B sound of his breakthrough – and there's no denying it's catchy as an October cold. Of course, no one expects lyrical innovation from a song about partying, but lines like "We gonna party like it's 2012" and "Party like it's the end of the world" are so timeworn that even Nicki Minaj struggles to breathe fresh life into it".

Chart performance
"2012 (It Ain't the End)" debuted at number 50 on the Billboard Hot 100 for the chart week of 13 August 2010, later peaking at number 31. It peaked at number 34 on the US Pop Songs chart and climbed for a few weeks from its debut at number 92 to its ultimate height at number 23 on the Canadian Hot 100 . The single also debuted at number 40 on the ARIA Charts for the chart week of 26 August 2010 and at number nine on the UK Singles Chart, on the issue of 24 October 2010.

Track listing

Music video
The music video for "2012 (It Ain't the End)" was shot in Los Angeles on 19 July 2010, with Nicki Minaj. The video is set to many flashing lights and a typical hip-hop club scene environment. But in post-production, Sean says the music video's director Erik White would be zooming out to show parties in three cities around the world. "There's all these wonderful ideas the director Erik White has been telling me [about]." 'They are gonna zoom out, and it's gonna zoom into Tokyo! And the world is gonna spin around!' And I'm like, 'Really? That's amazing!' So for me, I'm looking forward to seeing those effects." "The concept of the video is basically all about throwing the biggest party, celebrating life. It's basically going around the world, from London to Tokyo to New York, seeing people celebrating good times." The video should have a premiered on 8 August 2010 on MTV, however the same day Sean confirmed on Twitter that the premiere has been rescheduled. The video was leaked on 14 August 2010, but Jay Sean confirmed that the leaked version of the video wasn't the final version.

The video features a cameo appearance from former Spice Girl Melanie Brown, Cash Money Records CEO Birdman, writer Jared Cotter, producers J-Remy and Bobby Bass, and Thara. On 24 August 2010 was the final version of the video was released to VEVO. The prelude and the music video of his song "Break Your Back" can be heard and seen in the end of the music video, but the full version is yet to be released.

The video won Best Video in the 2011 UK Asian Music Awards.

Charts

Weekly charts

Year-end charts

Certifications

Release history

References

2010 singles
Jay Sean songs
Nicki Minaj songs
Cash Money Records singles
Songs written by Jay Sean
Songs written by Nicki Minaj
Songs written by Jared Cotter
2010 songs
2012 phenomenon